Chakravarty Sulibele (born 9 April 1980) is a writer who predominantly writes in the Kannada and Hindi languages. He is the founder of Yuva Brigade and Sodari Nivedita Pratishtana. He studied Engineering from Anjuman Engineering college bhatkal.

Early life
Sulibele was born on 9 April 1980 in Honnavar.
 
He worked as chief editor for Hosa Svatantryada Belaku. He later worked as managing editor for Garva, a weekly tabloid, and was a regular columnist in Vijaya Karnataka for more than two years and still writing columns for Vijayavani, Hosa Diganta, Samyukta Karnataka, Karmaveera, Viveka sampada and some other magazines. He writes columns in Vijayavani under the name "Vishwaguru".

Organization
Sulibele is the founder of 'Yuva Brigade', an organization involved in educating the youth on the contribution of soldiers to the nation, and patriotism.

Political activities
In the run-up to the 2019 general elections he founded Team Modi, working on a mission to re-elect Narendra Modi as Prime Minister. He toured all 28 districts of Karnataka State.

Controversies
Sulibele is known for his nationalist speeches, mostly in support of right-wing politics. On July 20, 2020 supporters of several political parties tried to troll him with under the belt hashtags on Twitter. Though there were claims of them trending, it made no effect on his charishma and influence among his followers.

Notable works 
Books written
 Apratima Desha bhakta Swatantra Veer Savarkar
 Neharu Parade Sariyitu
 Swatantrya Mahasangrama - 1857 Ondu Vakchitra
 Pepsi – coke antaraala
 Mera bharat mahaan
 Gadar Chalavali (2015)
 Bharata bhakta Vidyananda
 Jago Bharat - three parts
 Kargil Kadana Kathana
 Vishwa Guru Bharatha Series 1-2
 Aprathima Desha Bhaktha Saavarkar: Biography of Vinaayaka Damodhar Savarkar (1883 - 1966) (Kannada)

Books translated
 Bharata mateya kare
 Go Chikitse
 Swadeshi mattu bharateeyate

References 

Living people
Kannada-language writers
Writers from Bangalore
1980 births
People from Uttara Kannada